A crossing of the North American continental divide is necessary for any transcontinental railroad in North America, and has always been one of the hardest obstacles. This article lists such crossings from north to south.

Canada

United States

Mexico

Central America 

The Ecocanal is a proposal to build a rail line across Nicaragua from Monkey Point on the Caribbean to Corinto on the Pacific.  If built, the rail line will cross the continental divide in Nicaragua, likely at a point north of Lake Nicaragua.

See also
 List of Rocky Mountain passes on the continental divide
 Trans-Andean railways crossings of South America

References

 
 
 
 
Rail transport in Central America
North America transport-related lists